The Canning River is a major tributary of the Swan River in the South West Land Division of Western Australia. It is home to much wildlife including dolphins, pelicans, swans and many other bird species.

Source and route
With headwaters on the Darling Scarp, the Canning meanders through suburbs of Perth on the Swan Coastal Plain, including Cannington, Thornlie, Riverton, Shelley, Rossmoyne and Mount Pleasant, before joining the Swan at Melville Water just downstream of the Canning Bridge.

Bridges
 Canning Bridge
 Mount Henry Bridge
 Shelley Bridge
 Riverton Bridge
 Kent Street Weir Bridge
 Greenfield Street Bridge
 Canning River Downstream Bridge
 Canning River Upstream Bridge
 Djarlgarra Bridge Easthbound
 Djarlgarra Bridge Westbound
 unnamed railway bridge
 Royal Street Bridge
 unnamed pedestrian bridge
 Burslem Bridge
 unnamed railway bridge
 Jenna Biddi Footbridge
 unnamed railway bridge
 unnamed pedestrian bridge
 Cargeeg Bridge
 unnamed road bridge
 Manning Road Footbridge

Points
 Coffee Point (east of Point Heathcote on the Swan River)
 Deepwater Point (on western shore in Mount Pleasant)
 Salter Point (very narrow part of river between Salter Point suburb on north side, Rossmoyne/Shelley border on south)
 Prisoner Point (south shore in Shelley suburb, east of Shelley Beach)
 Wadjup Point (north west of Shelley Bridge)

History

The first European contact was in 1801 when a French exploring party spotted the mouth. The crew subsequently named the mouth Entrée Moreau after Charles Moreau, a midshipman with the party.

The Canning River received its contemporary name in 1827 when Captain James Stirling aboard  following an examination of the region in March 1827 named the river after George Canning, an eminent British statesman who was Prime Minister of Great Britain at the time and whose government facilitated the funds for the expedition.

In November 1829, just five months after the founding of the Swan River Colony, an exploring party led by now Governor James Stirling chose a site for a new town named Kelmscott on the banks of the Canning River.

Convicts

Convicts partly constructed and maintained the Canning River Convict Fence. This structure is still a notable landmark to this day. It was built primarily for the use of barges carrying timber from Mason's Timber Mill in the Darling Ranges.

Algae bloom
Algal blooms occur naturally in the Canning River system; they are caused by a buildup of nutrients in the river. Human activities including farming, residential gardens and parklands are the major causes of increases in levels; the blooms are potentially toxic to both mammal and marine life. The Swan River Trust monitors the levels of nutrients and growth of the algae, issuing warnings and closing sections of the river to all activities. The Trust also operates cleanup programs to reduce the amount of nutrients reaching the river, as well phosphorus removal and oxygenation in areas were blooms have been identified.

The Trust is encouraged by the appearance of Azolla carpets on sections of the Canning River as this fern is known to reduce the amount of sunlight available to the algae as well as absorbing large amounts of phosphorus and other nutrients from the water. However, it is possible that Azolla carpets can cause deoxygenation and emit a strong sulphur smell.

See also
Canning Dam
Canning River Regional Park
Head of the River
List of islands of Perth, Western Australia
Mount Henry Peninsula

References

Further reading

 
 
 
 
 
 

Swan River (Western Australia)

1962 British Empire and Commonwealth Games venues